Daniel Vujčić (born 12 April 1995) is a Slovenian footballer who plays as a midfielder for Krka.

Club career
He made his professional debut in the Slovenian PrvaLiga for Maribor on 16 May 2015 in a game against Domžale.

References

External links
 PrvaLiga profile 
 

1995 births
Living people
Slovenian footballers
Association football midfielders
NK Maribor players
NK Triglav Kranj players
NK Krka players
Slovenian PrvaLiga players
Slovenian Second League players